Apo-beta-carotenoid-14',13'-dioxygenase ( is an enzyme that catalyzes the chemical reaction

8'-apo-beta-carotenol + O2  14'-apo-beta-carotenal + uncharacterized product

Thus, the two substrates of this enzyme are 8'-apo-beta-carotenol and oxygen, whereas its two products are 14'-apo-beta-carotenal and an uncharacterized product that may be (3E,5E)-7-hydroxy-6-methylhepta-3,5-dien-2-one.

This enzyme belongs to the family of oxidoreductases, specifically those acting on single donors with O2 as oxidant and incorporation of two atoms of oxygen into the substrate (oxygenases). The oxygen incorporated need not be derived from O with incorporation of one atom of oxygen (internal monooxygenases o internal mixed-function oxidases).  The systematic name of this enzyme class is 8'-apo-beta-carotenol:O2 oxidoreductase.

References 

 Daruwalla A, Zhang J, Lee HJ, Khadka N, Farquhar ER, Shi W, von Lintig J, Kiser PD. Structural basis for carotenoid cleavage by an archaeal carotenoid dioxygenase. Proc Natl Acad Sci U S A. 2020 Aug 18;117(33):19914-19925. PMID: 32747548
 

EC 1.13.12
Enzymes of unknown structure